Valley Fort Rugby Football Club or Valley Fort RFC is one of the oldest mini and youth rugby clubs in Hong Kong., offering rugby for players 4–18 years of age.  It follows the widespread Football Code of Rugby Union and is the Academy Section of Hong Kong Rugby Football Union Division One Club, Valley Rugby Football Club.

Valley Fort RFC was founded in the 1970s through the merger of two of Hong Kong’s oldest and most prestigious rugby clubs, Stanley Fort RFC and Valley RFC. The original training ground was Stanley Fort – at the time, the home of the British Garrison on Hong Kong Island.  Some of our teams continue to train at the Fort.  However, with over 650 playing members, we are now one of the largest junior clubs in Hong Kong and have added training venues in Tai Tam, Aberdeen and Happy Valley.

Membership

Being a mini/youth rugby club, membership is through the youth players themselves; parents are not required to obtain a membership before their child can participate in rugby. Although there are no adult memberships, unlike the social norm practised by a number of prominent social clubs which offer mini/youth rugby, parents get involved by taking up the role as a team manager or coach – usually in one group in which their own child plays. In other cases, these parents join the club council/committee and administer the club. Membership application is relatively straightforward. There are few formalities apart from annual membership renewal at the start of each season in August/September.

Valley Fort Club Structure and Teams

Minis (U5-U12)

All the Minis teams train on Sunday mornings.  The older children (U9 to U12) also train on a Friday evening from mid-October onwards. Girls and boys train and play together until U9s when ‘contact’ skills begin to be introduced.  After that the girls teams for U9/U10 and U11/U12 are combined while we run separate age-group teams for the boys.

Competitive opportunities for the Minis up to U11 in the most-part take the form of ‘festivals’ where teams play short games of approximately 10 minutes against a number of different oppositions, as part of a family-oriented full day event.  There are usually six festivals each season, held once a month on a Sunday, from October onwards.

At U12, instead of festivals, teams play in one of two tournaments: The Richard Hawkes Cup (a mixed/boys tournament) and The Kim Lam Cup (a girls tournament).  There are six rounds of both tournaments and these are typically played on the same dates as the Minis festivals.

There is also a chance to compete overseas on the annual Club tour which has, in recent years, taken Minis players and their parents to Singapore, Japan and Malaysia.  The highlight of the season however, is the Hong Kong Sevens held in April each year, where the Minis play in showcase games at the Hong Kong Stadium in front of thousands of rugby fans and some of the players have an opportunity to be ball boys or girls.

Youth (U13-U19)

Our Youth teams train on Tuesday and Thursday evenings as well as on Sundays.  For boys, individual teams are fielded at the at U13, U14, U16 and U19 age-groups.  For girls, teams are combined at the U14 and U16 age group level.  In many of these age groups, both Premiership and Championship teams are fielded.

The season is split into three main parts:

 September & October – Training and friendly games
 November & December – XIIs and XVs league fixtures
 January, February & March – Xs and Sevens

Youth squads play regular full-length matches against a single opposition. Many of the Club’s Youth players are well represented in Hong Kong’s National Age Grade teams.

Valley Fort RFC Coaches
From U5 to U8, coaching is led by knowledgeable parents focused on fostering a love of the game and an understanding of the basic non-contact laws.

From U9 onwards, each of the teams is coached by a professional coach from Valley RFC.  He or she is supported by a parent coach whose role is expected to fade as the children progress towards Youth level.  The Valley RFC coaches are all high-level players; some play or coach at national level.  All are experienced professionals with a love and respect for the game, as well as up-to-date knowledge of training and playing strategies.

in bold = players internationals

Notable players 
 Andrew Kelly - former Edinburgh Rugby player. Scotland A. international.
 Kevin Curtis - former Taranaki Rugby Union player.
 Grant Livingston - former London Scottish player.
 Lee Jones - Hong Kong international.
 Niall Rowark - Hong Kong international.
 Salom Yiu - Hong Kong international.
 Ben Rimene - Hong Kong international.
 Jack Bennet - Hong Kong international.
 Kirk Munro - Hong Kong international.
 Justin Temara - Hong Kong international.
 Alex Ng - Hong Kong international.
 Andrew Bridle - Hong Kong international.
 Nick Hewson - Hong Kong international.
 Terence Montgomery - Hong Kong international.
 Alex Baddeley - Hong Kong international.

Sponsors and affiliations

The club is a recognised member of the Hong Kong Rugby Football Union, and is affiliated to Valley RFC as their Rugby Academy Section. Valley RFC is an adult Rugby Football Club also offering Team-Hockey and Netball. The hockey and netball sections also have a Youth Academy.

See also
 Rugby Football
 Rugby Union
 Rugby league
 Hong Kong Rugby Football Union
 Hong Kong national rugby union team
 Hong Kong women's national rugby union team
 Hong Kong Sevens

References

External links
 Official Club site
 Valley RFC: Senior Section of Valley Fort RFC
 Official site of Hong Kong Rugby-Football Union

Rugby clubs established in 1978
Hong Kong rugby union teams